Arne Olsson (born 1930) is a Swedish Lutheran bishop. He is the Bishop Ordinary of the Mission Province.

Olsson is a retired pastor in the Lutheran Church of Sweden, having been e.g. the parish priest of Habo. On 5 February 2005 in Gothenburg, he was consecrated as bishop of The Mission Province by The Most Reverend Walter Obare, the presiding bishop of the Evangelical Lutheran Church in Kenya. The Mission Province is theologically conservative and opposes women's ordination and same-sex unions and marriage.

External links
Missionsprovinsen: Biskoparna
Church of Sweden press release: Arne Olsson Disqualified as a Priest

Living people
Swedish Lutheran bishops
21st-century Lutheran bishops
1930 births